Laho may refer to:

Laho, Põlva Parish, village in Mooste Parish, Põlva County, Estonia
Laho, Räpina Parish, village in Räpina Parish, Põlva County, Estonia
Lake Laho, lake in Säässaare village, Põlva Parish, Põlva County, Estonia
Marc Laho (born 1965), Belgian tenor opera singer
Lahu, ethnic group of Southeast Asia and China